Jorge Luís dos Santos (born 23 April 1972 in Palhoça, Santa Catarina), known as Jorge Luís, is a Brazilian former footballer who played as a forward.

References

External links

1972 births
Living people
Sportspeople from Santa Catarina (state)
Brazilian footballers
Association football forwards
Avaí FC players
Central Sport Club players
Clube Atlético do Porto players
Al-Orouba SC players
Veikkausliiga players
FC Jazz players
Liga Portugal 2 players
Segunda Divisão players
C.F. União de Lamas players
Leixões S.C. players
Moreirense F.C. players
Hong Kong First Division League players
Happy Valley AA players
Brazilian expatriate footballers
Expatriate footballers in Oman
Expatriate footballers in Finland
Expatriate footballers in Portugal
Expatriate footballers in Hong Kong
Brazilian expatriate sportspeople in Oman
Brazilian expatriate sportspeople in Portugal